Gaston La Touche, or de La Touche (24 October 1854 – 12 July 1913), was a French painter, illustrator, engraver and sculptor.

Biography 

His family originally came from Normandy. He was born in Saint-Cloud. His passion for art began at a very early age and he finally persuaded his parents to give him drawing lessons, which he took for ten years from a local instructor at the rate of three Francs per month. His lessons had to be cancelled at the start of the Franco-Prussian War, when his family returned to Normandy to ensure their safety. This would be all the formal art training he ever received.

Nevertheless, in 1875 he was able to make his début at the Salon with a bas-relief portrait medallion of François Jules Edmond Got, an actor at the Comédie-Française, and several etchings. Between 1877 and 1879, he made the acquaintance of Edgar Degas and Édouard Manet, who he met with frequently at the Café de la Nouvelle Athènes. It was there that he was introduced to Émile Zola, some of whose works he would later illustrate.

Beginning in 1880, he produced dark toned works of social realism in the style of the Dutch Masters. His first painting was shown at the Salon the following year. Félix Bracquemond, a friend and associate, suggested that he might be more successful if he brightened his color palette and chose different subjects, recommending Antoine Watteau and François Boucher as models. He also painted landscapes and portraits in the style of Puvis de Chavannes, which brought him his first major successes at the Société Nationale des Beaux-Arts. In 1891, he burned most of his earlier paintings.

Later, he received commissions to provide decorations for the Town Hall in Saint-Cloud and the reception hall at the Ministry of Justice, although the latter were never installed there and are now at the Palais du Luxembourg. In 1900, he was one of several artists who provided decorations for Le Train Bleu, a famous restaurant near the Gare de Lyon.

In his later years, he divided his time between his studio in Saint-Cloud and his family's properties in Champsecret. In 1909, he was named an Officer in the Legion d'Honneur. In 1912, he completed his last major decorative project at "Villa Arnaga", Edmond Rostand's home in Cambo-les-Bains, which is now a museum. He died in Paris while painting.

Among the works he illustrated are L'Assommoir (The Dram Shop) by Zola, Aux flancs du Vase by Albert Samain, and Poèmes by Henri de Régnier.

Prizes, medals 
1884 - Medal (Third-class) at the Salon for A Wish and Another
1888 - Medal (Second-class) at the Salon for The New Mother
1889 - Silver Medal at the Exposition Universelle in Paris
1900 - Gold medal at the Exposition Universelle in Paris

Salons 

1875 - Société des Artistes Français, medallion portrait of Edmond Got
1881 - Exhibition of French Artists, The Fifth Lady
1882 - Paris Salon, The Burial of a Child in Normandy
1890 - Exhibition of the Société Nationale des Beaux-Arts, Phlox
1896 - Exhibition of the Société Nationale des Beaux-Arts, decorative panel that includes portraits of his wife and son

Exhibitions 
 1889 - Exposition Universelle in Paris
 1899 - Venice Biennale
 1900 - Exposition Universelle in Paris
 1908 - Galerie Georges Petit, a retrospective of more than three hundred works
 1909 - Galerie Boussod et Valadon in The Hague

Other selected paintings

References

Further reading 
 Selina Baring Maclennan, Gaston La Touche: A Painter of Belle Époque Dreams, Antique Collectors Club (2009) 
 Jean Valmy-Baysse, Gaston La Touche, sa vie, son œuvre, from the series "Peintres d'Aujourd'hui", éditions F. Juven, Paris, 1910. Online.
 Henri Frantz, Gaston La Touche 1854–1913, éditions Studio, Paris 1914, London 1915.
 "Important Painting by La Touche”. 1917. Bulletin of the Detroit Museum of Art, Vol. 11 (7/8), April–May, 1917. Detroit Institute of Arts: 65–68. pdf article at website. pdf thumbnails.

External links 

 Gaston La Touche website, homepage: with a biography, works,  publications and critical commentary.
 Paintings by La Touche @ The Athenaeum.

1854 births
1913 deaths
People from Saint-Cloud
19th-century French painters
French male painters
20th-century French painters
20th-century French male artists
French draughtsmen
Post-impressionist painters
19th-century French male artists